Teotia "Tewatia" "Tiwathia" is a gotra (clan) of Jat people in India which were the rulers & founders of Ballabhgarh kingdom. It is mainly found in Haryana, Rajasthan and Western Uttar Pradesh states.

References 

Jat clans of Uttar Pradesh
Jat clans of Haryana
Jat clans of Madhya Pradesh
Jat clans of Rajasthan